Gydan may refer to:

Gydan Peninsula, a peninsula in the Kara Sea
Gydan Bay, a bay in the Kara Sea
Gydan Nature Reserve, the northernmost nature reserve in Western Siberia 
Gydan Mountains, an obsolete name for the Kolyma Mountains
Yamal-Gydan tundra, an ecoregion in Northern Siberia